Night of the Bloody Apes is the debut, unreleased album by R.A. the Rugged Man. After it was shelved by Jive, he would later unofficially release it under the moniker Crustified Dibbs. The album significantly helped establish R.A. the Rugged Man's musical career. It also features a guest appearance from Biggie Smalls.

Track listing

Samples
Toolbox Murderer
"Let a Woman Be a Woman - Let a Man Be a Man" by Dyke & the Blazers

Every Record Label Sucks Dick
"Capricorn" by The Cannonball Adderley Quintet
"School Boy Crush" by Average White Band

Bloody Axe
"Papa Was Too" by Joe Tex
"Ain't No Half-Steppin'" by Big Daddy Kane

R.A. Be Down (Aww Baby Now)
"Goodbye Love" by Guy

Back To The Rubber-Room
"It's a New Day" by Skull Snaps
"FX & Scratches (Vol. 5)" by Simon Harris
"The Assembly Line" by Commodores

Bloodshed Hua Hoo
"Nobody Knows De Trouble I've Seen" by Harry T. Burleigh
"Get Out of My Life, Woman" by Lee Dorsey
"Think (About It)" by Lyn Collins

Bloody Body Parts in Da Fruit Punch Bowl
"Funky President (People It's Bad)" by James Brown

Bloodshed (Nigga Niles Crusty Remix)
"Funky Drummer" by James Brown

References

East Coast hip hop albums
1994 albums
Jive Records albums
Unreleased albums